Xosrov (also, Khosrov) is a village and municipality in the Agdash Rayon of Azerbaijan.  It has a population of 1,783. The municipality consists of the villages of Xosrov and Sadavat.

References 

Populated places in Agdash District